Then & Now is the seventh studio album by Tongan-American family band The Jets, released on August 25th, 1998, by Cold Front, a subsidiary of K-tel International, Inc.

At this point, the band only had four of the original members remaining but also had three new members, all younger siblings of the older members. It featured five new songs: "No Time to Lose", "That's Why God Made the Moon", "The Truth", "Ooh Baby", and "Sacrifice". While it is an album of entirely new recordings, it functions more as a greatest hits compilation, given that 7 of its 12 tracks are re-recordings of their top singles from the 1980's. The album did not sell nearly as well as their previous efforts, with only around 50,000 copies sold to date.

Track listing
 "Curiosity" (Jerry Knight, Aaron Zigman) – 4:43
 "Crush on You" (Jerry Knight, Aaron Zigman) – 4:16
 "Make It Real" (Rick Kelly, Linda Mallah, Don Powell) – 4:20
 "Rocket 2 U" (Bobby Nunn) – 4:19
 "Cross My Broken Heart" (Stephen Bray, Tommy Pierce) – 4:08
 "You Got It All" (Rupert Holmes) – 4:22
 "I Do You" (Rick Kelly, Linda Mallah) – 3:37
 "No Time To Lose" (Elizabeth Wolfgramm, Leroy Wolfgramm) - 3:33
 "That's Why God Made the Moon" (John Elefante) – 4:28
 "The Truth" (Cathy Massey, Claire Massey, Mark Jiaras, Mike Chapman, Tommy Gawenda) - 4:02
 "Ooh Baby" (Elizabeth Wolfgramm, Leroy Wolfgramm) - 3:55
 "Sacrifice" (Mike Chapman) - 3:31

1998 albums
The Jets (band) albums